Swachhand is a mountain of the Garhwal Himalayas in Uttarakhand, India. Its peak is the 46th highest located entirely within the Uttrakhand. Nanda Devi is the highest mountain in this category. Swachhand lies between the Satopanth  NNW and Janhukut  SSE. It's neighbour Janhukut peaks at 3.8 km SSE. It is located 8.9 km NW of Chaukhamba I  and 8.9 km NW lies Bhagirathi I .

Climbing history
In 1938, Professor Rudolf Schwarzgrubere, Edi Ellmauthaler, Dr Walter Frauenberger, Toni Meszner, and Leo Spannraft led a German expedition team consisting of five climbers and a medical officer to the Garhwal Himalaya. On September 23, Meszner and Spannraft reached the summit of Swachhand peak by the south ridge.

In 2002, a Canadian team of John Miller, Conor Reynolds, and Guy Edwards approached the west face of Swachland through Maiandi Bamak. Miller and Edwards reached the summit on October 6. This was the second ascent of Swachhand.

Glacier and rivers

Swachhand Bamak (Glacier) on the western side which later joins Gangotri Glacier. Maiandi Bamak (Glacier) on the southern side which also joins Gangotri glacier from there emerges Bhagirathi river one of the main tributaries of river Ganga. On the eastern side, the Bhagirathi Kharak Glacier merges with the Satopanth Glacier, from which the Alaknanda River emerges, one of the major tributaries of the Ganga.

Neighboring peaks

Neighboring peaks of Swachhand:

 Janhukut  
 Satopanth 
 Chaukhamba I 
 Bhagirathi I 
 Kharchakund

Peak data
Below are the details for the peak.
 Peak name: Swachhand
 Summit latitude: 30.80944
 Summit longitude: 79.22417
 Altitude in meters: 6721

See also
 List of Himalayan peaks of Uttarakhand

References

Mountains of Uttarakhand
Six-thousanders of the Himalayas
Geography of Chamoli district

I am a potato farmer I just wanted to let you know, sorry my professor is forcing me to make a change to this, I hate my self.